Shannon is a city in Quebec, Canada, along the Jacques-Cartier River northwest of Quebec City.

It was formed in December 1946 when it separated from the territory of Sainte-Catherine-de-Fossambault, following protests of this part of the population against the municipal taxes. The community was founded by Irish immigrants and once contained a substantial English-speaking population, though today it is chiefly French-speaking. Its longtime principal economic activity was the exploitation of wood bound for the shipyards of Quebec. The town is located near CFB Valcartier, an important Canadian military base.

History
The area was first settled in the 19th century, by mostly Irish immigrants. The place may have been named after a prominent settler family, as religious records indicated the death of a certain Richard Shannon in 1831 and Simon Shannon the next year. Further impetus to its development came around 1850 when the timber industry began and in 1860 when a sawmill was built. Around 1861, about two thirds of the population was Irish, and by 1900, half the population.

In 1905, the Shannon Post Office opened. In 1914, part of Shannon's territory was expropriated to enlarge the Valcartier military base.

In 1947, the Municipality of Shannon was officially established when it separated from the Parish Municipality of Sainte-Catherine-de-Fossambault.

Demographics 

Mother tongue:
 English as first language: 6.2%
 French as first language: 90.5%
 English and French as first language: 1.6%
 Other as first language: 1.4%

Cancer cluster
In 1997, it was discovered that the chemical trichloroethylene seeped into the town's water supply from a nearby munitions factory. It was claimed that this increased the rates of cancers in the area, with more than 3,000 people taking part in a group lawsuit against the federal government in 2003.

After years of campaigning, compensation was later awarded to some local residents, but the court did not endorse the link between the contamination and cancers. Instead, compensation was awarded for the contamination of water supplies.

See also
List of cities in Quebec

References

External links

Cities and towns in Quebec
Populated places established in 1946
Incorporated places in Capitale-Nationale
Cancer clusters
1946 establishments in Canada